Umatilla Municipal Airport  is a public-use airport located 1 nautical mile (1.85 km) east of the central business district of the city of Umatilla in Lake County, Florida, United States. The airport is publicly owned.

References

External links

Airports in Florida
Transportation buildings and structures in Lake County, Florida